"Say You, Say Me" is a song written and recorded by American singer and songwriter Lionel Richie for the film White Nights. The single hit number one in the US and on the R&B singles chart in December 1985. It became Richie's ninth number-one on the Billboard Adult Contemporary chart. The track is not available on the film's soundtrack album, as Motown did not want Richie's first single following the massive success of his 1983 album Can't Slow Down to appear on another label. It was included by Motown on Richie's 1986 release Dancing on the Ceiling.

Development and production
For the 1985 film White Nights, a ballet drama starring Mikhail Baryshnikov and Gregory Hines, director Taylor Hackford asked Richie to write a title theme. Unable to compose a song with "White Nights" in the title, Richie submitted a demo of the ballad "Say You, Say Me". Eventually, Hackford approved of the song and included the completed version in White Nights. Produced by Richie and James Anthony Carmichael, the song was primarily recorded in Richie's living room. In White Nights, "Say You, Say Me" was introduced over the closing credits.

Music video
A music video, also directed by Hackford, was made for the song. It featured inserted clips from White Nights.

Critical reception
For The New York Times in 1986, Stephen Holden called the song "a powerful mid-80's echo of the Beatles' late-60's chant-like ballads." However, in a mixed review of Dancing on the Ceiling, Mike Joyce of The Washington Post called the song "silly and horrendously overexposed."

In a 2007 retrospective of the January 11, 1986 Billboard Hot 100 chart, Whitney Pastorek of Entertainment Weekly graded "Say You, Say Me" with an A-minus, calling it "an enduring love song" and commenting "the cranked-up electric bridge alone should be enough to make it a classic."

In 2008, the song was ranked at number 74 of the top songs of all time on the Billboard Hot 100 chart, commemorating the first 50 years of the chart.

Commercial performance
In the US, the "Say You, Say Me" single sold a million copies and was no. 1 on for two weeks the Billboard R&B chart and for four weeks on the Hot 100.

The single was hugely successful in South Africa, attaining the No. 1 spot on the weekly charts and remaining thereon for a total of 30 weeks. It eventually became the No. 1 single of 1986 on that country's year-end Springbok charts.

Accolades

Track listing
 "Say You Say Me" – 3:59
 "Can't Slow Down" – 4:40

Personnel
 Lionel Richie – vocals, keyboards
 Greg Phillinganes – keyboards, Minimoog bass
 Michael Boddicker – Yamaha DX7 tub. bells
 Carlos Rios – acoustic guitar
 Steve Lukather – guitar 
 Tim May – guitar
 Abraham Laboriel – electric bass guitar
 John Robinson – drums
 Paulinho Da Costa – percussion
 Paul Leim – Oberheim DMX
 James Anthony Carmichael – string arrangements

Charts

Weekly charts

Year-end charts

All-time charts

Certifications

Lionel Richie and Rasmus Seebach version

In 2012, Lionel Richie re-recorded the song with Danish pop singer-songwriter Rasmus Seebach. The duet is featured on Richie's album Tuskegee, for which Richie has picked a host of best-selling singers from around the world in collaborations. The album version features American country singer Jason Aldean.

Track listing
"Say You, Say Me" – 5:09

Charts

See also
List of number-one singles and albums in Sweden
List of number-one singles of the 1980s (Switzerland)
List of number-one adult contemporary singles of 1985 (U.S.)
List of number-one adult contemporary singles of 1986 (U.S.)
List of Billboard Hot 100 number-one singles of 1985
List of Billboard Hot 100 number-one singles of 1986
List of number-one R&B singles of 1986 (U.S.)
List of number-one singles of 1985 (Canada)
List of number-one singles of 1986 (Canada)

References

External links
 

1985 singles
1985 songs
Lionel Richie songs
Best Original Song Academy Award-winning songs
Best Original Song Golden Globe winning songs
Billboard Hot 100 number-one singles
Cashbox number-one singles
Number-one singles in Finland
Number-one singles in Norway
Number-one singles in Sweden
Number-one singles in Switzerland
Songs written by Lionel Richie
RPM Top Singles number-one singles
Number-one singles in South Africa
Pop ballads
Contemporary R&B ballads
Song recordings produced by James Anthony Carmichael
Motown singles
Mercury Records singles